Damjan Krajišnik (born 29 April 1997) is a Bosnian footballer who plays as a midfielder for Radnički Kragujevac.

Club career
Born in Bijeljina, he started with the academy of local FK Radnik Bijeljina, from where he moved to the academy of neighbouring Serbian giants FK Partizan in 2012. In 2015 he had a hald season stint back in Bosnia with powerhouse from their capital, FK Sarajevo, before starting his senior career by debuting for FK Podrinje Janja playing at second Bosnian level, the First League of the Republika Srpska. In 2017, he signed with league rivals, ambitious FK Zvijezda 09, reaching with them promotion to the 2018–19 Premier League of Bosnia and Herzegovina. During the winter-break of the season, he accepted an offer to move abroad again, this time signing with Danish 1st Division side Næstved Boldklub. After exactly a year, he returned to former Yugoslavia, and joined Serbian SuperLiga side FK Mladost Lučani.

On 15 January 2021, Krajišnik moved to fellow league club FK Metalac Gornji Milanovac.

References

1997 births
Living people
People from Bijeljina
Bosnia and Herzegovina footballers
Bosnia and Herzegovina expatriate footballers
Association football midfielders
FK Partizan players
FK Sarajevo players
FK Podrinje Janja players
FK Zvijezda 09 players
Næstved Boldklub players
FK Mladost Lučani players
FK Metalac Gornji Milanovac players
Premier League of Bosnia and Herzegovina players
Serbian SuperLiga players
First League of the Republika Srpska players
Danish 1st Division players
Bosnia and Herzegovina expatriate sportspeople in Denmark
Expatriate men's footballers in Denmark